Drahma (Urdu:) is a town and union council of Dera Ghazi Khan District in the Punjab province of Pakistan.

References

Populated places in Dera Ghazi Khan District
Union councils of Dera Ghazi Khan District
Cities and towns in Punjab, Pakistan